Wheel of Fortune was a long-running New Zealand television game show that was last hosted by television personality Jason Gunn and co-host Sonia Gray. It was broadcast on TV2 from 1991 to 1996 and on TV ONE from 2008 to 2009.

History

1991–1996 original
The original New Zealand version of the popular American game show Wheel of Fortune was first broadcast in February 1991, on TVNZ channel TV2, at 5:30pm. The show, which was heavily modeled after Australia's version, was originally hosted by Phillip Leishman with co-host Lana Coc-Kroft, along with Grant Walker (also doing New Zealand's version of Sale of the Century at the time) as announcer. The show was later hosted by Simon Barnett.
During its time the show aired on various time slots and switched between TV ONE and TV2; at the show's peak it aired in prime time on TV ONE at 7:00pm, a time slot previously used to screen Sale of the Century, but moved off this slot in 1995 when TV ONE extended their news to a one-hour show followed by Holmes. After moving to TV2 in a 6:00pm time slot the show was ultimately axed in 1996 as the show could not compete with the 6pm news shows on TV ONE and TV3.

2008–2009 return
On 14 April 2008 the New Zealand version of Wheel of Fortune returned again to TVNZ channel TV ONE. The show returned with new hosts Jason Gunn and Sonia Gray. The show now airs at 5:30pm local time. At the conclusion of filming of the 2008 season TVNZ announced the show will return in 2009 bigger and better. Additionally Jason Gunn officially announced that his co-host Sonia Gray was pregnant with twins and that she would return to co-host the show after her pregnancy. Greer Robson temporarily took Sonia's role on the show until she returned in May, 2009.

It was announced on 2 May 2009 that the series was being cancelled after only one year on air. The reasons given by TVNZ for the cancellation were lower ratings than the previous season, decreased advertising revenue and the high cost of producing the show. Lower ratings may have resulted after reformatting of the show interrupted its flow due to an increased emphasis on 'Speed Digits'. The last show was screened in June 2009.

David Tua incident
One notable episode which appears from time to time in blooper specials was boxer David Tua's game on October 10, 1992: at one point, he asked for P when buying a vowel; at another, he tried to buy a "consonant". He was also believed to have tried to call "O for awesome" which went on to become a famous quotable saying in New Zealand,  although the main problem was that he was supposed to call a consonant.

References

Wheel of Fortune (franchise)
New Zealand game shows
TVNZ 1 original programming
TVNZ 2 original programming
1991 New Zealand television series debuts
1996 New Zealand television series endings
2008 New Zealand television series debuts
2009 New Zealand television series endings
1990s New Zealand television series
2000s New Zealand television series
Roulette and wheel games
New Zealand television series based on American television series